A Quick Reference Handbook (QRH) is an aircraft technical document – quick-access manual for aircraft pilots that contains all the procedures applicable for non-normal and emergency conditions in an easy-to-use format.  In addition, performance data corrections are also provided for specific conditions. A QRH is kept in the cockpit and can be consulted whenever the flight crew experiences in-flight problems.

Format 
The first QRHs in the 20th century were made out of paper, but in the 21st century, many pilots have switched to so-called electronic flight bags, which have the advantage of electronic search functions, but require electricity to work. Some modern aircraft such as the Airbus A330 have computerised some of the checklists, but other checklists cannot be properly programmed, because some problems cannot be correctly identified or diagnosed by aircraft computers; thus, the Quick Reference Handbook remains an essential in-flight tool for the crew.

Contents 
QRH includes various checklists for dealing with abnormal and emergency situations, based on the equipment and furnishings on the airplane. The aircraft manufacturer-designated checklists are always included in a QRH, and often the airline company or operator will include its own procedures. Therefore, there is no single universal QRH and they may differ widely in contents, but in practice, individual versions of it are referred to as the Quick Reference Handbook. When designed and used correctly to address issues such as turbine engine failures or on-board fires, a QRH can prevent aviation accidents and incidents.

QRH have to include time-critical information and frequently used information for the flight crew.

One example of a checklist in a QHR is the Engine Failure/Fire – Severe Damage or Separation checklist. Another example is the Cabin Altitude Warning or Rapid Depressurization checklist.

See also 
 Aircraft flight manual
 Electronic flight bag
 Preflight checklist

References 

Aviation-related lists
Aviation safety
Checklists
Emergency aircraft operations
Aviation publications